is a passenger railway station located in the city of Kumagaya, Saitama, Japan, operated by the private railway operator Chichibu Railway.

Lines

Station layout
The station is staffed and consists of a single island platform serving two tracks. The station building and entrance is connected to the platforms by an underground passage. Two freight sidings lie to the south of the platform tracks.

Platforms

Adjacent stations

History
Ishiwara Station opened on 7 October 1901.

Passenger statistics
In fiscal 2018, the station was used by an average of 1027 passengers daily.

Surrounding area
 Saitama Kumagaya High School
 Saitama Kumagaya Agricultural High School

See also
 List of railway stations in Japan

References

External links

 Ishiwara Station information (Saitama Prefectural Government) 
 Ishiwara Station timetable 

Railway stations in Saitama Prefecture
Railway stations in Japan opened in 1901
Railway stations in Kumagaya